Gerry Tuite (14 February 1910 – 20 February 1990) was an  Australian rules footballer who played with North Melbourne in the Victorian Football League (VFL).

Notes

External links 

1910 births
1990 deaths
Australian rules footballers from Victoria (Australia)
North Melbourne Football Club players